Geraldine: The Winner's Story is Peter Kay's sequel to Britain's Got the Pop Factor... and Possibly a New Celebrity Jesus Christ Soapstar Superstar Strictly on Ice; it aired on 19 December 2008.  To coincide with this and compete with the X-Factor winning song, Peter Kay released "Once Upon a Christmas Song" co-composed by Gary Barlow.

References

Channel 4 comedy